Mangi Mahal is an Indian Punjabi folk singer.

Biography

Mahal debuted with his album Marhak Jamalo Di. His duet songs are performed with Sudesh Kumari. Mahal's biggest hits are "Sachhi Saunh Lagge", "Jatt Velly", "Jatt Di Charhayi", "Yaar Velly", "Dimand", "Putt Punjabi" and "Jaan". He has 9 studio albums.

His new album will be releasing in April 2014, "Khalse De Guru", Tracks 9 and it will be the label on Dharam Seva Records, Music Waves & T-Series. Music will be composed by Harj Nagra.Mangi Mahal also released latest hit single track "Tralle" with the music label Saa Music. All the media consultancy currently given by Maharaj E Media.

Discography

Filmography

Single

References

Bhangra (music)
Indian Sikhs
Indian male singers
Punjabi people
Living people
1974 births